John Frazer may refer to:

John Frazer (Australian footballer) (born 1956), Australian rules footballer for North Melbourne and Fitzroy
John Frazer (architect) (born 1945), English architect and CAD pioneer
John Frazer (cricketer) (1901–1927), Australian-born English cricketer
John Frazer (politician) (1827–1884), Irish-born Australian politician
John Fries Frazer (1812–1872), American geologist
John W. Frazer (1827–1906), American soldier, planter, and businessman

See also
Jack Frazer (born 1931), Canadian politician
John Fraser (disambiguation)